Kingsway Christian  School is a private, coeducational Christian school located south of Orrville, Ohio and west of Riceland. It serves students in grades K-12.

History
Kingsway Christian was founded in 1992, originally having grades K–6.  Beginning in 1997 the 7th grade was added and for the next five years each successive grade was added.  Kingsway's first graduation was held in June 2003 when 17 students received their diplomas.  The school is parent-sponsored and uses a non-denominational approach to Christian education.  Kingsway is a member of Association of Christian Schools International (ACSI).

Demographics
The demographic breakdown of the 154 K-12 students enrolled in 2015-2016 was:
Black - 9.7%
Hispanic - 4.6%
White - 83.7%

Athletics
The Kingsway Eagles provide a number of athletic opportunities for students including basketball (girls and boys teams, junior high and high school), volleyball (girls, junior high and high school), soccer (girls and boys teams, junior high and high school), baseball (high school only), and cheerleading (junior high and high school girls).  The school is also a member of the OCSAA and the ICSO Athletic Conference.

OCSAA Girls Varsity Basketball State Final Four - 2019

OCSAA Girls Varsity Basketball State Champions - 2018

ICSO Varsity Girls Basketball State Champions - 2020

ICSO Varsity Girls Basketball Regular Season Champions - (2021-2022)

OCSAA Varsity Boys Basketball State Final Four - 2013

ICSO Varsity Boys Basketball State Final Four - 2021, 2023

ICSO Varsity Boys Basketball State Champions - 2023

NCSAA Division 4D Varsity Boys National Champions - 2016

OCSAA Varsity Girls Volleyball State final Four - 2018

OCSAA Varsity Soccer State Final Four - 2021

External links
 School Website

Notes and references

Christian schools in Ohio
High schools in Wayne County, Ohio
Private high schools in Ohio
Private middle schools in Ohio
Private elementary schools in Ohio